John Anthony Palumbo (born 1956 in Birmingham, Alabama)<ref>"Whale of sales" Florida Times-Union 2020-07-30.</ref> is an American author, businessman and professional speaker who writes and lectures internationally on consumer behavior, sales psychology, and personal development."High-risk investor shares tips on how to avoid big financial mistakes" Florida Times-Union. Retrieved October 9, 2013. He is based in Jacksonville, Florida.

Life and career

Palumbo is the owner and chief executive officer of The Sterling Group, Inc. a company he founded in 1982. Headquartered in Jacksonville, Florida, the company provides consulting on leadership, management, sales and marketing, and real estate project development. He works with a group of international builders and developers including from North America, Europe, and South America.

He is a member of and instructor for the National Association of Home Builders Institute of Residential Marketing (IRM). Palumbo often serves as a guest keynote speaker at new home sales conferences and national conventions including the International Builders' Show (IBS), Super Sales Rally, Southeast Building Conference (SEBC), and the Midwest Builders’ Conference."John Palumbo, The Closing Master, to speak at Northeast Florida Builders Association's Sales and Marketing Council" What's Up Jacksonville?. Retrieved March 26, 2018. In 2020, his daughter, Morgan Palumbo, joined him onstage to present The UnSalesperson at the International Builders’ Show.

Palumbo has developed proprietary educational programs that have been approved by real estate licensing agencies to educate real estate brokers and realtors. He has written several books on psychology, consumer behavior, and the science of influence and persuasion including What's Your Sales DNA?. Palumbo is the CEO of The Sales DNA Institute and has been interviewed as an expert in the art of influence and persuasion by a number of publications including the Wall Street Journal. Palumbo has also appeared on numerous podcasts and radio shows, including Polish National Radio(October 2013) "BALANCE :: Is Poland immune to American turbulence?" Polskie Radio. Retrieved October 17, 2014. and Builder Radio.(April 2014) "The Art of Hypnotic Sales Persuasion" Builder Radio. Retrieved October 17, 2014.

On July 26, 2016, Palumbo was awarded the Certified Speaking Professional (CSP) designation which was conferred by the National Speakers Association.

Television guest expert

On November 10, 2003, television news anchor Staci Spanos introduced Palumbo as "America's Investment Gambler" on the Jacksonville, Florida television station, WJXT. Palumbo appeared on WJXT's The Morning Show over 70 more times between 2003 and 2009 as a regular contributing guest in a segment called "The Investment Gambler".

Asset management

Palumbo is the principal of Bankruptcy Asset Management, a company which targets the acquisition of undervalued and unusual assets. In 2002, the company acquired the royalty rights for deceased Roots author, Alex Haley, and currently includes songs by Johnny Cash, Dwight Yoakam, and Tammy Wynette. Serving attorneys, CPAs, and bank trust officers, Palumbo consults on matters of bankruptcy, probate, and trust estates with banks. He serves in court as an expert witness for his knowledge in the liquidation and disposition of complex assets.

Palumbo is a member of the National Association of Bankruptcy Trustees (NABT) and is invited regularly to their Spring Seminars and Annual Conventions as an expert speaker and panelist. He has written on the topic of recognizing value in items dismissed as worthless. Palumbo's articles have been featured in the official publication for the NABT, the American Bankruptcy Trustee Journal (formerly NABTalk).

Executive Producer
Singing in Color
In September 1998, Palumbo became Executive Producer and owner of the video documentary, "Singing in Color." The film "Singing in Color", directed by Bruce Weinstein, shows how music is a vehicle for the message of peace. It tells the story of the Chicago Children's Choir's historic tour of South Africa, including a personal visit with Nelson Mandela, in the summer of 1996. The film is sold at the choir's performances and proceeds support the operation of the choir.

America's Dumbest Criminals
In September 2003, Palumbo became Executive Producer of the syndicated television series America's Dumbest Criminals after acquiring all television rights, trademarks, and copyrights from the Entheos Group based in Nashville, Tennessee.

“America's Dumbest Criminals" racked up high ratings in its first four seasons in the United States. The series has since syndicated airings in more than 30 countries, according to New York-based Lacey Entertainment, which markets and distributes the series worldwide. The show has continued to enjoy global success with its 104 episodes, including video series, books, and apparel.

Honors, designations, and awards
 Sales Manager of the Year Award – National Association of Home Builders
 Million Dollar Circle Lifetime Award – National Association of Home Builders
 Certified New Home Marketing Professional (CMP) – National Association of Home Builders
 Master, Institute of Residential Marketing (MIRM) – National Association of Home Builders
 Board of Governors – Institute of Residential Marketing
 Certified Speaking Professional (CSP) Award/Designation – National Speakers Association
 2016 John P. Hall Outstanding Achievement in Sales and Marketing Award – Florida Sales and Marketing Council
 Order of Merlin – International Brotherhood of Magicians
 2018 William "Bill"  Molster Lifetime Achievement Award – National Association of Home Builders’ National Sales and Marketing Council (NSMC)

Bibliography
Books

Audio books
 Palumbo, John (November 1, 2010). Close and Grow Rich: Fourteen Untapped Powers You Already Have To Close Your Next Deal. Sterling Learning Group. .

e-Books
 Palumbo, John. Honey, I Shrunk The Mortgage (2003). Jacksonville, Florida. Sterling Learning Group. 
 Palumbo, John. Invest in Yourself (2003). Jacksonville, Florida. Sterling Learning Group.
 Palumbo, John. 7 Hidden Advantages of Preconstruction Purchases (2003). Jacksonville, Florida. Sterling Learning Group.
 Palumbo, John. How To Build A Fortune Using A Self Directed IRA (2004). Jacksonville, Florida. Sterling Learning Group.
 Palumbo, John. Sell it Yourself (2004). Jacksonville, Florida. Sterling Learning Group.
 Palumbo, John. Amazing Car Secrets (2006). Jacksonville, Florida. Sterling Learning Group.
 Palumbo, John. Building Wealth With Tax Liens Certificates (2006). Jacksonville, Florida. Sterling Learning Group.

Journal articles
 Palumbo, John. "Long-term Thinking Creates Short-term Gains for the Estate". American Bankruptcy Trustee Journal. Volume 36, Issue 01, Spring 2020.
 Palumbo, John. "Confessions of a Foreign Asset Bounty Hunter". American Bankruptcy Trustee Journal. Volume 34, Issue 02, Spring 2018.
 Palumbo, John. "Ten Strategies to Triumph Over". Timeshares.
 Palumbo, John. "Interesting Assets: Find ‘Em, Liquidate “Em". NABT: Journal of the National Association of Bankruptcy Trustees. Volume 24, Issue 03, Fall 2008.
 Palumbo, John. "The Top 10 Assets Most Likely to be Abandoned (but shouldn't be)". NABT: Journal of the National Association of Bankruptcy Trustees. Volume 22, Issue 03, Winter 2006.
 Palumbo, John. "Turning the Unusual Into the Usual". NABT: Journal of the National Association of Bankruptcy Trustees. Volume 19, Issue 03, Fall 2003.

e-Course
 Palumbo, John. 52 Selling Ideas (2020). Jacksonville, Florida. Sterling Learning Group. 

Discography
Audio/CDs
 ClosingNomics: Sell More, Close More, Earn More (2012). Jacksonville, FL: Sterling Learning Group. .
 Sell the Results: An Audio Companion (2016). Jacksonville, FL: Sterling Learning Group. .
 Overcoming the 9 Biggest Negotiation Deal Breakers (2017). Jacksonville, FL: Sterling Learning Group. .
 Highly Influential: An Audio Companion (2018). Jacksonville, FL: Sterling Learning Group. .

Video/DVDs
 Sales Expert Academy''. (2010). Jacksonville, Florida. Sterling Learning Group.

References

External links
John Palumbo Official site
Selling on Stage: The Sales Process
Closing Encounters: How to Close the Deal
My Sales DNA: A step-by-step formula for cracking your personal sales mastery code

American male writers
Living people
People from Birmingham, Alabama
People from Jacksonville, Florida
1956 births
Television producers from Alabama
Television producers from Florida